Anita Chukwumfumnaya Obidi , (born 23 June 1991), known as Korra Obidi, is a Nigerian dancer, singer-songwriter and model.

Background and education 
She is from the Ogboli clan of Oshimili North in Delta State. She was born into a family of three girls and a boy. Her mother is deceased. Her family attended Deeper Christian Life Ministry and so she hid her passion for dancing from them while growing up.

Career

Dance 
She was the recipient of an AFRIMMA nomination for the Best Dancer in 2017. She performed in the Basketball Africa League 2017/2018 season. She was a contestant in the 2019 edition of the American talent show So You Think You Can Dance while heavily pregnant.
She started her dance career in 2007, featuring in a song by Nigerian female rapper Sasha P.

Film 
Obidi was a child star in Nigerian Nollywood movies in the late 2000s. After a hiatus, she returned in 2022 as one of the cast of the Nollywood movie, What If. The movie also starred Alexx Ekubo, Bolanle Ninalowo, Mercy Ima Macjoe and Patience Ozokwor. She also featured in TV series Another Ordinary Day; The Flatmates; Lumba Boys alongside Francis Duru; and movie Saro, the musical.

Modelling 
She has walked the runway at the Port Harcourt International Fashion Week and at the GTBank Fashion Week. She also contested in the Miss Global pageant Nigeria where she was crowned Miss Congeniality. She was the vixen in the music video of American group Black Eyed Peas, titled Wings as well as of Nigerian musicians Tekno and Orezi's Whine For Daddy.

Music 
Obidi released her debut single in 2015 titled Man Like You. The video was directed by Paul Gambit. She also released the song titled Kilibe featuring Mz Kiss, and then she released Vibration featuring Victoria Kimani. She released two music albums namely Woman Power Series (2016) and Sounds From The Throne Room (2019).

Personal life 
She was married to Justin Dean and they have 2 children together. The couple are currently separated having come to a conclusion to annul their marriage following a public disagreement hinging on infidelity, mismanagement of funds and domestic violence. She also cited her mental health as one of the reasons she quit her marriage. Her ex-husband demanded for spousal support after the split. She is based in the US.

References 

Nigerian women pop singers
 University of Lagos alumni
Musicians from Delta State
Living people
Nigerian rhythm and blues singers
Igbo people
 People from Delta State
English-language singers from Nigeria
21st-century Nigerian women singers
Nigerian women singer-songwriters
1994 births